Mildenhall railway station is a disused railway station that was the terminus of the closed Cambridge to Mildenhall railway.  It served the market town of Mildenhall, Suffolk, and closed for passengers in 1962. The station building is now a private residence and the goods shed to the west of the station has been used by local businesses for storage and other purposes.

References

External links
 
 Mildenhall station on navigable 1946 O. S. map
 Mildenhall at Disused Stations

Disused railway stations in Suffolk
Former Great Eastern Railway stations
Railway stations in Great Britain opened in 1885
Railway stations in Great Britain closed in 1962